Slick Dogs and Ponies is the third studio album from American garage rock band, Louis XIV.  Its release date was January 29, 2008.

The album was leaked on torrent networks on January 18, 2008, after the band temporarily added all of the songs to their MySpace page.

Reception

Initial critical response to Slick Dogs and Ponies was negative. At Metacritic, which assigns a normalized rating out of 100 to reviews from mainstream critics, the album has received an average score of 37, based on 10 reviews.

Track listing

 "Guilt By Association"
 "Air Traffic Control"
 "Misguided Sheep"
 "There's a Traitor in This Room"
 "Sometimes You Just Want To"
 "Tina"
 "Stalker"
 "Free Won't Be What it Used to Be"
 "Swarming of the Bees"
 "Hopesick"
 "Slick Dogs and Ponies"

Bonus Tracks

iTunes Deluxe Bundle
 "Air Traffic Control (Oxygen Remix)"
 "Eleanor Rigby"
 "Thief In The Choir (Feat. Brandon Flowers)"

Hot Topic Exclusive
 "Money Bunny"
 "Actors and Singers"

Rhapsody
 "Dirty Knees"

Independent Retail
 "Save a Prayer"
 "Ride a White Swan"

References

External links
 

2008 albums
Louis XIV (band) albums